Sir Matthew Wood may refer to 

 Sir Matthew Wood, 1st Baronet (1768–1843), English politician, Lord Mayor of London from 1815 to 1817
Sir Matthew Wood, 4th Baronet (1857–1908), English cricketer

See also
Matthew Wood (disambiguation)